The Coalition for Genetic Fairness (CGF) is a public interest group concerned about genetic discrimination. The group was founded in 1997 by several organizations. Much of the CGF's work to date has been surrounding the Genetic Information Nondiscrimination Act.

Members

The following is a partial list of CGF's members:

20th Century Fox
American Academy of Family Physicians
American Association for the Advancement of Science
American Civil Liberties Union
American Heart Association
Association of American Medical Colleges
Brown University
Council for Responsible Genetics
Facing Our Risk of Cancer Empowered (FORCE)
Genetic Alliance
Harvard Medical School- Partners HealthCare Center for Genetics and Genomics
Huntington's Disease Society of America
Jewish Council for Public Affairs
Medgar Evers College, CUNY
Medical College of Wisconsin
National Association for the Advancement of Colored People (NAACP)
National Association of Social Workers
Sarah Lawrence College
Susan G. Komen for the Cure Advocacy Alliance
University of Missouri Division of Medical Genetics
University of North Dakota Division of Medical Genetics
Yale Cancer Genetic Counseling
Zeta Phi Beta National Education Foundation

References

Genetics organizations
Medical and health organizations based in Washington, D.C.